The MRU Super League 2015 was the 11th season of MRU Super League, Malaysia's domestic rugby union competition. It kicked off on 17 February 2015. The final was held on 21 March 2015 and won by Keris Conlay, 18 - 11 over COBRA.

Teams

A total of 12 teams will compete in the 2015 season.

  Cobra RC
  NS Wanderers RC
  UPM Angels
  UiTM Lions
  ASAS RC
  Bandaraya Dragons RC
  RMAF Blackhawks
  Keris Conlay RC
  JLJ Diraja
  SSTMI Tsunami
  Mersing Eagles
  Politeknik Merlimau

Season

In preliminary stage, all 12 teams were divided into 2 groups, and a single round-robin tournament was held by both groups. Top 4 of each group were advanced to knockout stage, while the lowest placed team will be relegated to the National Inter-Club Championships (NICC) next year.

Standings

Teams 1 to 4 (Green background) at the end of the preliminary competition rounds qualify for the final stage.
The lowest-placed teams (Red background) were eliminated to the 2016 National Inter-Club Championships.

Grouping stage matches

Week 1

Week 2

Week 3

Week 4

Week 5

Week 6

Final stage

Quarter-finals

Semi-Finals

Third placing

Final

See also

 MRU Super League

External links
Malaysia Rugby

2015
2015 rugby union tournaments for clubs